Jeffrey David "Jeff" Maehl (born March 16, 1989) is a former American football wide receiver. He was signed by the Houston Texans as an undrafted free agent in 2011. He played college football at Oregon.

In addition to his run with the Texans, Maehl played for the Philadelphia Eagles.

High school career
Maehl played for the Paradise High School Bobcats in Paradise California, where he was given the opportunity to display his skills on the field.  He wore the #15 jersey in green and gold. He played in the 2007 Lions Club District 4C-1 All-Star Game along with former rival at Pleasant Valley High School quarterback Jordan Rodgers.

College career
He played college football with the University of Oregon Ducks. As a senior in 2010, Maehl caught 77 passes for 1,076 yards while helping Oregon to the 2011 BCS National Championship Game. In that game, quarterback Darron Thomas and Maehl combined to set the record for the longest pass play from scrimmage in a championship game: 81 yards. Prior to the 2011 NFL Draft, Maehl was predicted to be a late-round draft pick by draft analyst Mel Kiper Jr.

NFL Combine

At the NFL Combine, Jeff Maehl had a strong performance. He measured in at 6'1" and 190 lbs and had a slower than average 40-time of 4.62 seconds. However, in the measures of quickness - 20-yard shuttle, 60-yard shuttle, and 3-cone drill - Maehl finished 2nd, 1st, and 1st respectively. Maehl's 6.42 second 3-cone drill was not only the fastest in this year's draft, but the fastest it has been run in six years. He still holds the current record as of the end of 2021 Combine.

Professional career

2011 NFL Draft

Maehl went undrafted in the 2011 NFL Draft, but he was selected with the final pick of the 2011 UFL Draft by the Virginia Destroyers. Maehl was signed by the Houston Texans as an undrafted free agent on July 25, 2011.  Despite being waived by Houston on September 3, 2011, Maehl was signed to the Texans practice squad on September 4, 2011.  On December 13, 2011, Maehl was signed to the active roster following the release of fellow wide receiver Derrick Mason. Maehl was cut on September 1, 2012, while the Texans were trimming their roster to 53 men, signed by Texans to the practice squad on September 4, 2011, signed from practice squad to active roster by Texans on December 13, 2011, and signed by the Texans to Reserve/Future contracts on January 24, 2013.

Maehl was traded to the Philadelphia Eagles for offensive tackle Nate Menkin on August 12, 2013, where he was reunited with his former college coach Chip Kelly.
In week four of the 2013 season Maehl came in during a blowout loss to the Denver Broncos in the fourth quarter, catching a touchdown.

Personal life
Maehl lives in Eugene, Oregon, with his wife Britnee and their two cats. Maehl has a full sleeve tattoo on one arm and a half-sleeve on his other. Maehl has many other tattoos, with some matching his wife's. He has one on his right arm that says "Paradise California", his hometown the town is now burned to the ground, and features a row of pine trees, and more scripture and design. There is a tattoo on his left arm in honor of drowned former teammate Todd Doxey, who died in 2008. Doxey was a close friend and roommate of Maehl.

References

External links
Oregon Ducks bio

1989 births
Living people
People from Paradise, California
Players of American football from California
American football wide receivers
Oregon Ducks football players
Houston Texans players
Philadelphia Eagles players